See America Thirst is a 1930 American pre-Code comedy film produced and distributed by Universal Pictures and directed by William James Craft. Silent comics Harry Langdon and Slim Summerville star along with Bessie Love. Though released late in 1930, it nevertheless had a silent version.

In the film, Bessie Love introduced the type of sandals later known as "flip-flops" to American audiences. The title is a parody of the Cole Porter musical See America First.

Plot 
Slim (Summerville) and Wally (Langdon) are mistaken for hired killers, and are paid to murder a bootlegger. They encounter nightclub singer Ellen (Love), associated with the district attorney's office, who assists them in convincing the gang leader to pay them double for protection. Everything goes well until the actual hired killers show up.

Cast

Reception 
The film did not receive positive reviews, and was deemed not to be funny.

Preservation status 
Copies are preserved at the UCLA Film and Television Archive and the Library of Congress.

References

External links

Databases

Promotional materials 
 Lobby poster
 Advertising
 Lobby setup
 Lantern slide

1930 films
1930 comedy films
American black-and-white films
American comedy films
Films directed by William James Craft
Films scored by Heinz Roemheld
Films set in New York City
Universal Pictures films
1930s English-language films
1930s American films